A university system is a set of multiple affiliated universities and colleges that are usually geographically distributed. Typically, all member universities in a university system share a common component among all of their various names. Usually, all member universities of a university system are governed by a system-wide governing body, such as a board of trustees or a board of regents. In the United States, many states have one or two state university systems under which many of their publicly funded universities are aligned, both in name and in governance. Additionally, for-profit universities, such as DeVry University, often have multiple campuses which share the same name; these may be, but are not always, described as a university system.

In Canada, university system usually refers to the collection of all universities within a jurisdiction, as distinguished from other post-secondary institutions. Used as a point of comparison, it may refer to the universities within a province or within a country. In the UK, university system has been used to refer to the policy and practise of integrated administration and infrastructure of the universities within the country.

In the Philippines, university system is a title granted by the Commission on Higher Education to a private or public higher education institution after complying certain requirements. The commission defines university system as an organized academic entity composed of separate but interrelated units, at least one of which has university level status. A single governing board is responsible for the formulation of system-wide policies and programs. A university system has its own system administration headed by a chief executive officer. Its function is to coordinate and integrate system-wide functions and activities. Each constituent unit has its own chief executive officer to whom broad powers is delegated by the governing board for the organization and operation of the constituent unit.

List of university systems

Asia

India

 Indian Institutes of Technology A group of 23 public research universities specializing in engineering and sciences.
 National Institutes of Technology A group of 31 public research universities specializing in engineering and sciences.
 Indian Institutes of Management A group of 20 public universities specializing in business and management education.
 Indian Institutes of Science Education and Research A group of 7 public research universities focused on the fundamental and applied sciences.
 All India Institutes of Medical Sciences A group of 19 universities focused on medical education and research.
National Law universities A group of 23 universities focused on world class legal and judicial education and research

Iran
 Islamic Azad University (2 independent and 31 state Universities)
 Technical and Vocational University
 University of Applied Science and Technology
 Payame Noor University
 Farhangian University
 Academic Center for Education, Culture and Research

Malaysia
 Universiti Teknologi MARA System (1 main campus, 4 satellite campuses, 4 autonomous state campuses, 8 state branch campuses, 9 city campuses, 21 affiliated colleges, 1 international campus, 1 training hospital, and 2 training hotels)

Philippines
De La Salle Philippines (16 campuses)
Mindanao State University System (8 constituent universities, 3 attached colleges)
St. Paul University System (7 campuses)
University of Perpetual Help System (4 DALTA campuses, 5 JONELTA campuses)
University of the Philippines System (8 constituent universities, with 10 campus locations)
University of Santo Tomas System (5 campuses)

Taiwan
 University System of Taiwan (4 campuses)
 Taiwan Comprehensive University System (4 campuses)
 University System of Taipei (3 campuses)

Thailand
 Rajabhat University system (38 universities)
 Rajamangala University of Technology (9 universities)

Europe

France
 Federal University of Toulouse (an alliance of 3 constituent universities and 27 institutes)
 Paris-Saclay University (a collegiate university with 10 dependent colleges, 6 constituent colleges or « Grandes Écoles »)
Paris Sciences et Lettres University (a collegiate university with 11 constituent colleges or « Grandes Écoles », 8 associate colleges)
Polytechnic Institute of Paris (a collegiate university with 5 constituent colleges or « Grandes Écoles »)

Greece
 State University System of Greece

Ireland 
 National University of Ireland (4 constituent universities, 1 recognized college)

United Kingdom

England
 University of London (17 constituent colleges)

Northern Ireland
 Ulster University (4 campuses)

Scotland
 University of the Highlands and Islands (13 colleges and institutes)

South America

Brazil
 Federal University of Technology – Paraná (campuses in 13 cities in the state of Paraná)
 São Paulo State University (campuses in 24 cities in the state of São Paulo)
 Bahia State University (campuses in 24 cities in the state of Bahia)
 State University of Western Paraná (campuses in 5 cities in the state of Paraná) 
 Amazonas State University ("campuses" in 19 cities in the state of Amazonas)

North America
 DeVry University (23 major campuses in the United States and Canada)

Canada
 Université du Québec (10 universities, schools and institute)
 Canadian Military College system

Mexico
 Anahuac University Network: a private university system with 8 campuses throughout Mexico, plus some allied institutions located in Spain, Italy, United States, Chile and France.

Puerto Rico
 Ana G. Méndez University System (5 campuses) It also has 3 sub-systems and a research center. Each of the campuses have off-campus centers that function independently and thus act as individual campuses.
 Interamerican University of Puerto Rico (9 campuses)
 Pontifical Catholic University of Puerto Rico (4 campuses)
 NUC University (6 campuses)
 University of Puerto Rico (11 campuses)

United States

 University of Alabama System (3 campuses)
 Air University
 Army University (170 schools and campuses)
 Auburn University System (2 campuses)
 University of Alaska System (3 campuses)
 Arizona Board of Regents (3 universities)
 Maricopa County Community College District (11 campuses + 2 skills centers)
 University of Arkansas System (5 universities, 1 medical school, 2 law schools, 1 graduate school for public service, 5 community colleges, 1 division of agriculture)
 Arkansas State University System (10 campuses)
 University of California (10 campuses under direct administration, plus an independently administered law school)
 California State University (23 campuses)
 California Community Colleges System (110 campuses)
 Claremont Colleges (7 institutions)
 University of Colorado (4 campuses)
 Colorado State University (3 campuses)
 Connecticut State Colleges & Universities (CSCU) (17 campuses)
 University of Connecticut (5 campuses)
 Florida College System (28 campuses)
 State University System of Florida (12 institutions)
 University System of Georgia (26 colleges and universities)
 Technical College System of Georgia (22 colleges)
 University of Hawaii System (3 campuses)
 University of Illinois system (3 institutions)
 Southern Illinois University (2 institutions and multiple campuses)
 Indiana University (9 campuses)
 Purdue University System (5 campuses)
 Ivy Tech Community College of Indiana (23 campuses)
 Kentucky Community and Technical College System (16 campuses)
 Louisiana State University System (2 medical schools, 1 law school, 1 dental school, 1 veterinary school) (10 campuses)
 University of Louisiana System (9 campuses)
 Southern University System (5 campuses)
 Louisiana Community and Technical College System (10 campuses)
 University of Maine System (7 campuses)
 Maine Community College System (7 campuses)
 Marine Corps University
 University System of Maryland (13 campuses)
 University of Massachusetts System (5 campuses)
 University of Michigan (3 campuses)
 University of Minnesota system (5 campuses)
 Minnesota State (30 state colleges, 7 state universities, in total operate 54 campuses)
 Saint Mary's University of Minnesota (3 campuses)
 University of Missouri System (4 campuses)
 Montana University System (14 campuses)
 University of Nebraska system (4 campuses)
 Nebraska State College System (3 campuses)
 Nevada System of Higher Education (2 universities, one state college, 4 community colleges, and one research institute)
 University System of New Hampshire (4 campuses)
 City University of New York (24 campuses)
 State University of New York (64 campuses)
 University of North Carolina (16 campuses, plus one affiliated high school)
 Johnson & Wales University (2 campuses around the United States)
 North Dakota University System (11 campuses)
 University System of Ohio (13 campuses with 23 2-year institutions)
 Oklahoma State University System (4 university campuses and 2 health centers)
 Regional University System of Oklahoma (RUSO) (6 universities on 12 campuses)
 Oregon University System (7 institutions; defunct)
 Commonwealth System of Higher Education (4 institutions with 33 campuses)
 Pennsylvania State System of Higher Education (14 institutions with 20 campuses)
 University of South Carolina System (8 campuses)
 University of Tennessee system (5 campuses)
 Tennessee Board of Regents (6 universities, 13 community colleges, 26 technology centers)
 University of Houston System (4 institutions and 2 multi-institution teaching centers)
 University of North Texas System (3 institutions)
 University of Texas System (14 institutions)
 Texas A&M University System (11 institutions)
 Texas State University System (7 institutions)
 Texas Tech University System (5 institutions)
 Brigham Young University System (5 institutions—Provo, Hawaii, Idaho, LDS Business College, and online Global Pathways)
 Utah System of Higher Education (16 institutions)
 Vermont State Colleges (5 campuses)
 Virginia Commonwealth University (2 campuses)
 Virginia Community College System (23 campuses)
 University of Virginia (2 campuses)
 University of Wisconsin System (13 institutions, 26 campuses)
 Wisconsin Technical College System (16 institutions)

See also
 Affiliating university
 Colleges within universities in the United Kingdom

References

Types of university or college